Thomas Francis Lee (born 11 December 1874) was an Australian rules footballer who played with Collingwood in the Victorian Football League (VFL).

Family
The son of John Lee (1824-1904), and Elizabeth Lee (1837-1874), née Conn, Thomas Francis Lee was born at Nirranda, Victoria on 11 December 1874.

Notes

References

External links 

Tom Lee's profile at Collingwood Forever		
 

1874 births
Year of death missing
Australian rules footballers from Victoria (Australia)
Collingwood Football Club players